Faculty psychology is the idea that the mind is separated into faculties or sections, and that each of these faculties is assigned to certain mental tasks. Some examples of the mental tasks assigned to these faculties include judgment, compassion, memory, attention, perception, and consciousness. For example, we can speak because we have the faculty of speech or we can think because we have the faculty of thought.   Thomas Reid mentions over 43 faculties of the mind that work together as a whole. Additionally, faculty psychology claims that we are born with separate, innate human functions.

The views of faculty psychology are explicit in the psychological writings of the medieval scholastic theologians, such as Thomas Aquinas, as well as in Franz Joseph Gall's formulation of phrenology, albeit more implicitly. More recently faculty psychology has been revived by Jerry Fodor's concept of modularity of mind, the hypothesis that different modules autonomously manage sensory input as well as other mental functions.

Faculty psychology resembles localization of function, the claim that specific cognitive functions are performed in specific areas of the brain. For example, Broca's area is associated with language production and syntax, while theWernicke's Area is associated with language comprehension and semantics. It is currently known that while the brain's functions are separate, they also work together in a localized function.

Additionally, faculty psychology depicts the mind as something similar to a muscle of the human body since both function the same way. The way of training a muscle is by repetitive and brutal training in order to adapt the muscle to the type of workout you’re putting it through. Therefore, by putting your mind through plenty of brain-exercising problems, your mind will also increase in knowledge. In fact, it is also called ”mental discipline”.“Mental discipline” is also the best way to train one’s mind intellectually because when you’re focused, you’re motivated to learn. For example, an athlete who works on their sprinting every day, by running the same distance every day. After a certain time, their body is gonna adapt to the energy and the effort they put into their training. Similarly, if a student were to read the same book weekly for an entire year. They will eventually have read the same book 52 times, and by reading this often, their mind will process the information quicker when they see the same words and will share a deeper understanding and meaning of the same book.

Some psychologists brand it as a fallacy due to it being outdated, but others think that it is a necessary philosophical standpoint with added things for the conclusions of experiments because of bias. Faculty Psychology is branded as a philosophy due to the advancements in science. The term ‘faculty’ has been abandoned by psychologists due to their thinking that is old-fashioned, though many psychologists still abide by this philosophy. Many psychologists have moved on to newer psychological philosophies based on the theories they came up with on the brain and how it works with the help of modern technology.

Historical change 
It is debatable to what extent the continuous mention of faculties throughout the history of psychology should be taken to indicate a continuity of the term's meaning. In medieval writings, psychological faculties were often intimately related to metaphysically-loaded conceptions of forces,, particularly to Aristotle's notion of an efficient cause. This is the view of faculties which is explicit in the works of Thomas Aquinas:

By the 19th century, the founders of experimental psychology had a very different view of faculties. In this period, introspection was well-regarded by many as one tools among others for the investigation of mental life. In his Principles of Physiological Psychology, Wilhelm Wundt insisted that faculties were nothing but descriptive class concepts, meant to denote classes of mental events that could be discerned in introspection, but which never actually appeared in isolation. He took caution in insisting that older, metaphysical conceptions of faculties must be guarded against and that the scientist's tasks of classification and explanation must be kept distinct:

It was in this and the ensuing period that faculty psychology came to be sharply distinguished from the act psychology promoted by Franz Brentano—whereas the two are barely distinguished in Aquinas, for example.

Faculty Psychology in different domains

Faculty psychology from different perspectives 
For thousands of years, a debate has been ongoing: whether we are born with knowledge or gain it through experience. Multiple philosophers have different opinions on it and thus, the debate is still ongoing to this day. It has been called many names over the years: Pocketknife vs. Meatloaf, nativism vs. empiricism, and more recently, faculty psychology vs. associationism. In Seven and a Half Lessons About the Brain, Lisa Feldman Barrett describes faculty psychology, using a metaphor, being the pocketknife brain. It is called this due to the fact that faculty psychology is the theory that the mind is separated into sections that serve their own purpose just like a pocketknife. She describes this concept by mentioning exponents, instead of simply adding a mere tool to our brain(2¹⁴), adding an entire new function for each faculty/tool (3¹⁴), resulting in a more complex brain. The conclusion made results in a much more flexible brain that contains complex traits. Lisa Feldman Barrett links her idea of the pocket brain to phrenology’s idea of how the brain functions.

Connections to Faculty Psychology

Complex brain 
Humans have, thanks to evolution, pretty complex brains. However, not everyone knows what a complex brain really is. A complex brain is able to adapt to its environment and it's because of that we humans can live in society. We’re able to change the environment or meet new people and because of our complex brains, we can adapt to all those changes. Our brain also allows us to resist injury since if certain neurons are occupied doing other things or simply stop working, other neurons will take their places and do what they were originally intended to do. Consequently, we can compare the complex brain and the Pocketknife brain together. In the complex brain, a group of neurons is able to do another group of neurons’ jobs while in the Pocketknife brain, it’s a whole different story: occupied or lost neurons are seen as losses of purpose.

Meatloaf brain 
Not only does Lisa Feldman Barrett present the idea of the pocketknife brain, she also mentions a new idea called the meatloaf brain. Just like the pocketknife brain and our human complex brain, it contains the same amount of neurons. Although, unlike these two every single neuron is connected to one another. She describes her meatloaf brain as a single element since all neurons are connected to one another. If a single neuron receives the green light to modify it/’s firing rate, it will control the outcome and firing rate of every other neuron, in contrast to faculty psychology where the brain’s neurons are divided into their own separate tasks and do not share as many connections with one another.

References

Citations

Bibliography

 Barrett, Lisa Feldman (2020). Seven and a Half Lessons About the Brain. Boston: Houghton Mifflin Harcourt. p. 42, 159. 
 Edmund J. Sass, Ed.D. “Faculty Theory and Mental Discipline”.
 Field, G. C. (1921). "Faculty psychology and instinct psychology." Mind, 30(119), 257-270.
 Lehman, H. C., & Witty, P. A. (1934). Faculty psychology and personality traits. The American Journal of Psychology, 46(3), 486-500.
 Commins, W. D. (1933). What is “Faculty Psychology”?. Thought: Fordham University Quarterly, 8(1), 48-57.

External links
 Divisions of Gall's brain

History of psychology
Psychological schools